Vangelis Krios (born 23 September 1973) is a Greek former professional footballer who played as a midfielder.

Career
Born in Mouzaki, Krios began playing youth football for Olympiacos F.C. He signed his first professional contract with Levadiakos F.C. during 1993, making 50 Alpha Ethniki appearances for the club in two seasons, the latter resulting in relegation to the second division. Krios joined Greek second division side Ialysos F.C. for the 1995–96 season. He would return to the Greek top division by signing with Edessaikos F.C. in December 1996, and would appear in a further 11 Alpha Ethniki matches for the club. Edessaikos were relegated and Krios began the 1997–98 season with the club in the second division.

Next, Krios moved to Spain, where he played club football for Ponferradina and Ceuta over the next 10 seasons.

Following his playing career, Krios stayed in Spain and plans to become a coach.

References

External links
 

1973 births
Living people
Greek footballers
Greek expatriate footballers
Levadiakos F.C. players
Apollon Pontou FC players
Edessaikos F.C. players
Association football midfielders
People from Mouzaki
Footballers from Thessaly